Podkova may refer to:

 Podkova, a former genus of wasps currently treated as a junior synonym of Horismenus
 Podkova (film), a 1913 Austro-Hungarian comedy film
 Podkova (village), a village in Kirkovo Municipality, Kardzhali Province, Bulgaria